Triggs may refer to:

People
 Andrew Triggs (born 1989), American professional baseball pitcher
 Arthur Bryant Triggs (1868–1936), Australian grazier and collector
 Clarence Triggs (1943–1966), American murder victim
 Gillian Triggs (born 1945), Australian academic specialising in public international law
 Glenn Triggs (born 1983), Australian screenwriter, director, producer, editor and music composer
 Harold Triggs (1900–1984), American composer and pianist
 Hayden Triggs (born 1982), New Zealand former rugby union player
 Inigo Triggs (1876–1923), English country house architect and author
 Jim Triggs (contemporary), American luthier
 Trini Triggs (born 1965), American country music artist
 Walter Triggs (1880–?), English professional footballer
 William Henry Triggs (1855–1934), English-born member of the New Zealand Legislative Council

Other
 Triggs, the dog of Irish footballer Roy Keane
 Jackson-Triggs, a Canadian winery
 Trigg's Arkansas Battery, a Confederate Army artillery battery during the American Civil War

See also
 Trigg (disambiguation)
 Trygg (disambiguation)